The Lewis-Palmer School District (LPSD) is a school district in El Paso County, Colorado that serves the Tri-Lakes communities of Monument, Palmer Lake, Woodmoor and select areas of Colorado Springs.  

Lewis-Palmer School District is home to Colorado's largest public geothermal project, Palmer Ridge High School.  

The district was "Accredited with Distinction" by the State of Colorado in 2010, recognizing that it is within the top 7% of Colorado school districts.

Like many American school systems, LPSD enforces zero-tolerance policies.

The Inez Johnson Lewis School in Monument is on the List of Registered Historic Places in Colorado.

Schools

Elementary schools 
 Bear Creek Elementary School
 Kilmer Elementary School
 Lewis-Palmer Elementary School
 Palmer Lake Elementary School
 Prairie Winds Elementary School

Bear Creek Elementary was created to replace Grace Best Elementary, which closed in mid-2010. It is in the building where Creekside Middle School was previously located.

Middle schools 
 Lewis-Palmer Middle School

High schools
Lewis Palmer High School
Palmer Ridge High School

Charter schools
Monument Academy is a charter school located in Monument, and is the only charter school in Lewis-Palmer District 38. In 1995, a group of parents came together believing that they could create a school where high academic standards, small class sizes, respect, and responsibility were valued and emphasized. Lewis-Palmer Charter Academy (renamed Monument Academy in 2000) was founded in 1996.

In the first year, enrollment was approximately 180 students.  MA has steadily grown since 1996 to the 2005-2006 school year enrollment of over 600 students. It now includes kindergarten through 8th grade. It previously had a high school program that closed, however in 2017, MA began planning to open a new high school no sooner than the 2018-19 school year.

As a charter school, it is a publicly funded, tuition-free school created by parents, teachers, and community members. MA is required to meet or exceed district and state academic standards, as well as abide by all state and federal non-discrimination, health and safety laws.

Monument Academy is called a Public School of Choice.

See also
List of school districts in Colorado

References

External links
Lewis-Palmer School District #38

School districts in Colorado
Education in El Paso County, Colorado